Dmytro Olehovych Hrachov (Ukrainian: Дмитро Олегович Грачов; born 5 December 1983, in Lviv) is an athlete from Ukraine that competes in archery.

Hrachov competed at the 2004 Summer Olympics in men's individual archery. He won his first match, advancing to the round of 32.  In the second round of elimination, he was defeated. His final rank was 24th overall. Hrachov was also a member of the bronze medal Ukrainian men's archery team at the 2004 Summer Olympics.

References

1983 births
Archers at the 2004 Summer Olympics
Archers at the 2012 Summer Olympics
Living people
Sportspeople from Lviv
Ukrainian male archers
Olympic archers of Ukraine
Olympic bronze medalists for Ukraine
Olympic medalists in archery
Medalists at the 2004 Summer Olympics
Universiade medalists in archery
Universiade bronze medalists for Ukraine
Medalists at the 2005 Summer Universiade
Medalists at the 2009 Summer Universiade
Medalists at the 2011 Summer Universiade
21st-century Ukrainian people